Dolinsk is the name of several inhabited localities in Russia.

Urban localities
Dolinsk, Sakhalin Oblast, a town in Dolinsky District of Sakhalin Oblast

Rural localities
Dolinsk, Orenburg Oblast, a settlement in Toksky Selsoviet of Krasnogvardeysky District of Orenburg Oblast